United Nations Security Council Resolution 194, adopted unanimously on September 25, 1964, reaffirmed its previous resolutions on Cyprus and extended the stationing period of the United Nations Peacekeeping Force in Cyprus for another 3 months, now ending December 26, 1964.

See also
Cyprus dispute
List of United Nations Security Council Resolutions 101 to 200 (1953–1965)

References
Text of the Resolution at undocs.org

External links
 

 0194
 0194
1964 in Cyprus
September 1964 events